Palaeosystenus is an extinct genus of flies in the family Dolichopodidae, known from Baltic amber. It contains only one species, Palaeosystenus succinorum.

References 

†
†
Prehistoric Diptera genera
†
Baltic amber
Eocene insects
Oligocene insects